Rocca Massima is a comune (municipality) in the Province of Latina in the Italian region Lazio, located about  southeast of Rome and about  north of Latina, in the Monti Lepini area.

References

Cities and towns in Lazio